This is a list of notable people from or living in Oakville, Ontario in alphabetical order.

A
Susan Aglukark, Inuk singer
Damon Allen, quarterback, CFL's Toronto Argonauts
Zenon Andrusyshyn, former CFL's Toronto Argonauts placekicker
Anjulie, pop singer
Jason Arakgi, Canadian Football League player
Peter Armstrong, CBC journalist
Anita Anand, Member of Parliament

B

Bryan Baeumler, host of Disaster DIY
Donovan Bailey, Olympic gold medalist and former world record holder in the 100 metres
Alison Baird, children's fantasy author
Tim Bakker, CFL player
Jeff Batchelor, snowboarder
Lindy Booth, actress
Evan Bouchard, ice hockey player
Erika Brown, curler
Desmond T. Burke, Canada Sports Hall of Fame Member; winner of the 1924 King's Prize
Molly Burke, blind youtuber and motivational speaker

C
Larry Cain, Olympic gold medalist in men's canoe
Eric Cairns, Pittsburgh Penguins defenceman
Amice Calverley, English-born Canadian Egyptologist and composer.
Jamie Campbell, Rogers Sportsnet baseball analyst
Dillon Casey, actor
Ivan Chiriaev, Russian basketball player
Brock Chisholm, first Director General of the World Health Organization
William Chisholm, founder of the town of Oakville
Steve Christie, former NFL placekicker
Michael "Pinball" Clemons, player & coach, CFL's Toronto Argonauts
Tom Cochrane, musician
Reggie Cornell, horse racing trainer
Alex Crepinsek, professional lacrosse player with the Georgia Swarm of the National Lacrosse League (NLL) 
Ian Crichton, musician, lead guitarist of Saga

D
Arlene Duncan, actor 

Adam DiMarco, actor

E
Janette Ewen, décor and lifestyle expert

F
Joel Feeney, singer and songwriter
Tom Fergus, former NHLer
Dan Ferrone, CFL's Toronto Argonauts
J.D. Fortune, musician and former frontman of INXS
Matt Foy, NHL player

G
 Sam Gagner, NHL player
 Cody Goloubef, NHL player 
 Alice Glass, former frontwoman of the electronic band Crystal Castles
Adam Graves, former NHLer

H
Hagood Hardy, musician
Vic Hadfield, former NHL player
James Hinchcliffe, Indycar racer
Lauren Holly, actress

I
Malcolm Ingram, award-winning filmmaker, Small Town Gay Bar

J
Daniel Jebbison, footballer for Sheffield United, born 2003
Brianne Jenner, Olympic Gold Medalist and member of the Canadian women's national ice hockey team.

K
Bob Kelly, former NHL player
Jason Kenney, Premier of Alberta, Member of Parliament for Calgary Southeast

L
Kara Lang, former Canadian international soccer player and current TV analyst
Scott Laughton, NHL player 
Ray Lawson, former Lieutenant Governor of Ontario
Granville Liggins, former Canadian Football League player
Matt Luff, NHL player for the Los Angeles Kings
Tabitha Lupien, actress

M
Ron MacLean, host of Hockey Night in Canada
Steve Mason, goalie, Philadelphia Flyers
Miriam McDonald, Degrassi: The Next Generation actress
Tony Mandarich, former NFL offensive lineman
Anne-Marie Mediwake, Global TV news anchor
Alice Merton, singer-songwriter
John Mitchell, NHL player, Toronto Maple Leafs
Eric Monkman, academic and television personality
Sean Morley, WWE wrestler

N
Ryland New, businessman, Canadian Horse Racing Hall of Fame
Briar Nolet, dancer and actress

P
Sandra Post, former LPGA golfer
Stuart Percy, Pittsburgh Penguins defenceman

R
Pamela Rabe, actor
Jasmine Richards, actor
Brian J. Robinson, musician

S
Michael Schade, operatic tenor
Madeline Schizas, figure skater and represented Team Canada at the 2022 Winter Olympics.
Shawn Stasiak, WWE wrestler
Karla Stephens-Tolstoy, CEO of Tokii; former CEO of Vodafone CZ
Diana Swain, CBC Television journalist
 Andrew Sznajder (born 1967), English-born Canadian tennis player

T
John Tavares, ice hockey player
 Michael Therriault, actor
Shane Told, musician, lead singer of Silverstein

V

Mike Vanderjagt, NFL kicker
Adam van Koeverden, Olympic gold medalist, kayak singles 500

W
Rick Wamsley, former NHLer
Scott Wilson, forward, Pittsburgh Penguins

X 
Allie X, singer-songwriter

Z
Rob Zamuner, former NHL player

References

 
Oakville, Ontario
Oakville